The 1562 Battle of Kyōkōji (教興寺の戦い) was one of many battles fought between the Miyoshi and Hatakeyama in Japan's Sengoku period. On 19–20 May of that year, the battle was won by Miyoshi Nagayoshi over Hatakeyama Takamasa.

References 

1562 in Japan
Kyokoji
Conflicts in 1562